Danny Rubin (born July 26, 1991) is an American-Israeli professional basketball player who last played for Bnei Herzliya of the Israeli Basketball Premier League.

He won a gold medal with Team USA in basketball in the 2013 Maccabiah Games, and he played college basketball for Boston College. In 2015, he was named to the Eurobasket.com All-Israeli National League 2nd Team.

Biography
Danny Rubin is Jewish. After graduating from Boston College in 2014, he moved to Israel.

Sports career
In high school, he was selected as a McDonald's All-American nominee, he earned honorable mention All-Met, All-Gazette and All-Montgomery County Sentinel honors as he averaged 18 points a game as a senior at Landon School in 2010, and led them to back to back Interstate Athletic Conference titles.

He played college basketball for Boston College. The Washington Post ran an article of his impressive rise, entitled "Danny Rubin goes from Landon to Boston College walk-on to ACC starter."
In July 2013, Rubin represented Team USA in the 2013 Maccabiah Games. Coached by Maccabi Haifa head coach Brad Greenberg, Rubin and his teammates competed in the "open" division of this tournament. He scored 25 points as Team USA beat Team Argentina, 87–76, to win the gold medal.

In 2014, he moved to Israel and joined Hapoel Kazrin/Galil Elion for the 2014–15 season. In 29 games for Kazrin, he averaged 15.1 points, 4.6 rebounds, 1.9 assists and 1.6 steals per game.  He was named to the Eurobasket.com All-Israeli National League 2nd Team.

On July 23, 2015, Rubin signed with Bnei Herzliya.

References

External links
Israeli League profile

1991 births
Living people
American expatriate basketball people in Israel
Basketball players from Maryland
Bnei Hertzeliya basketball players
Boston College Eagles men's basketball players
Competitors at the 2013 Maccabiah Games
Jewish men's basketball players
People from Chevy Chase, Maryland
Maccabiah Games basketball players of the United States
Maccabiah Games gold medalists for the United States
Shooting guards
American men's basketball players
Maccabiah Games medalists in basketball
21st-century American Jews